Cowarie Station most commonly known as Cowarie is a pastoral lease that operates as a cattle station in north east South Australia.

The Diamantina River merges with the Mulligan River on Cowarie forming the Warburton River which continues to flow to the south west and into Lake Eyre.

History
The name is Aboriginal in origin and is the name for marsupial rat common to the area. Many other leases in the area were also soon taken up leading to much greater traffic along the Birdsville track and a post office opened at Cowarie in 1877.

Sidney Kidman in partnership with his brother Sackville acquired Cowarie in 1895, the first property acquired by the Kidmans who went on to build the largest cattle empire seen in Australia.

The same year Oldfield won the commonwealth Bank Ibis award for rural productivity in recognition of her work with wildlife management and conservation on the property.

In 2009 the station was running a mixture of shorthorn and Santa Gertrudis cattle which benefitted from the floodwaters flowing down the Diamantina River that reached the station that year.

Mirra Mitta Bore
The bore was sunk in 1903 as part of the governments plan to sink bores along the Birdsville-Marree stock route in order to provide a permanent water supply. The waters then flow along a bore drain.

See also
List of ranches and stations

References

Stations (Australian agriculture)
Pastoral leases in South Australia
Far North (South Australia)
1875 establishments in Australia